Regina Raye Felder (born March 3, 1962) is an American politician. She is a member of the South Carolina House of Representatives from the 26th District, serving since 2012. She is a member of the Republican party.

References

Living people
1962 births
Republican Party members of the South Carolina House of Representatives
21st-century American politicians

Women state legislators in South Carolina